The 22nd Coates Hire Rally Australia was the tenth rally of the 2013 World Rally Championship, held from 12 to 15 September, 2013. Sébastien Ogier won his sixth rally of the season.

Results

Event standings

Special Stages

Power Stage 
The "Power Stage" was a 29.44 km (18.29 mi) stage at the end of the rally.

Standings after rally 

Drivers' Championship standings

Manufacturers' Championship standings

Other 
WRC-2 Drivers' Championship standings

References 
 Coates Hire Rally Australia 2013 - juwra.com
 22. Coates Hire Rally Australia 2013 - ewrc-results.com

2013 World Rally Championship season
Rally Australia
Rally Australia